Crockett & Jones is a shoe manufacturing company, established in 1879 by Charles Jones and Sir James Crockett in Northampton, England. They were able to establish the company with a grant from the Thomas White Trust. It specialises in the manufacture of Goodyear-welted footwear. It is currently being run by the great grandson of its co-founder, Charles Jones.  Crockett & Jones produces both men's and women's footwear with three collections offered for men (Hand Grade Collection, Main Collection and Shell Cordovan Collection) and a limited range of boots and low heeled shoes produced for women.

History

Northampton is traditionally known for its shoe-making skills, one reason for setting up the factory there in 1879. At the start of operations they produced men’s boots. In the 1890s the second generation of  Harry Crockett and Frank Jones began to modernise with more advanced machinery, particularly equipment produced by Charles Goodyear. It produced shoes at a faster rate with lighter manual work.

In 1897, Crockett and Jones expanded the company into a larger factory and purchased the facility, which is still in use by the company.

In the 1910s the company began exporting a large part of their production to Australia, Argentina, South Africa, USA and the far east though the UK still remained its principal market.

In the 1930s with the third generation of the founders and still a family business, production reached 15,000 pairs of shoes each week. The majority of these were women’s boots and shoes. They also supplied the 1940s war effort producing over a million pairs of officers' boots. The company stopped production of their usual footwear during this time.

The company has continued to evolve and absorb the changes necessary to make it competitive, but still maintaining a high quality product. This is where all operations for the company take place, including production, design and development.

The factory in Perry Street, Northampton, dates back to the 1890s with additions to the main building in 1910 and 1935, giving a large internal working space. It has a large proportion of glass to give good natural lighting throughout the building and a pleasant working environment, but can get rather cold in the winter and extremely warm in the summer.

In 1947, the grandson of Charles Jones, Richard Jones, joined the family company. In 1977 he was appointed Managing Director and is still involved with it today as acting Chairman. Jonathan, Richard's son, also became involved with the family business in 1977.

As at 2014 there were 11 Crockett & Jones retail shops and concessions based in London, Birmingham, Paris, Brussels and New York City. The shops provide a contemporary showcase for ready to wear footwear, including velvet slippers and driving shoes and accessories.

In popular culture
The James Bond film Skyfall has Daniel Craig wearing Crockett & Jones shoes.

Awards
Crockett & Jones received the Diploma D’Onore for their designs in 1911.

References

External links
 Crockett & Jones
 Boot & Shoe quarter conservation area of Northampton

Shoe companies of the United Kingdom
Manufacturing companies based in Northampton
Companies established in 1879